César Abraham Vallejo Mendoza (March 16, 1892 – April 15, 1938) was a Peruvian poet, writer, playwright, and journalist. Although he published only two books of poetry during his lifetime, he is considered one of the great poetic innovators of the 20th century in any language. He was always a step ahead of literary currents, and each of his books was distinct from the others, and, in its own sense, revolutionary. Thomas Merton called him "the greatest universal poet since Dante". The late British poet, critic and biographer Martin Seymour-Smith, a leading authority on world literature, called Vallejo "the greatest twentieth-century poet in any language." He was a member of the intellectual community called North Group formed in the Peruvian north coastal city of Trujillo.

Clayton Eshleman and José Rubia Barcia's translation of The Complete Posthumous Poetry of César Vallejo won the National Book Award for translation in 1979.

Biography

César Vallejo was born to Francisco de Paula Vallejo Benítez and María de los Santos Mendoza Gurrionero in Santiago de Chuco, a remote village in the Peruvian Andes. He was the youngest of eleven children. His grandfathers were both Spanish priests, and his grandmothers were both indigenous Peruvians.

Lack of funds forced him to withdraw from his studies for a time and work at a sugar plantation, the Roma Hacienda, where he witnessed the exploitation of agrarian workers firsthand, an experience which would have an important impact on his politics and aesthetics. Vallejo received a BA in Spanish literature in 1915, the same year that he became acquainted with the bohemia of Trujillo, in particular with APRA co-founders Antenor Orrego and Victor Raul Haya de la Torre.

In 1911 Vallejo moved to Lima, where he studied at National University of San Marcos; read, worked as a schoolteacher, and came into contact with the artistic and political avant-garde. While in Lima, he also produced his first poetry collection, Los heraldos negros. Despite its stated publication year of 1918, the book was actually published a year later. It is also heavily influenced by the poetry and other writings of fellow Peruvian Manuel González Prada, who had only recently died. Vallejo then suffered a number of calamities over the next few years: he refused to marry a woman with whom he had an affair; and he had lost his teaching post.

His mother died in 1918. In May 1920, homesickness drove him to return to Santiago de Chuco. On the first of August, the house belonging to the Santa María Calderón family, who transported merchandise and alcohol by pack animals from the coast, was looted and set on fire. Vallejo was unjustly accused as a both a participant and instigator of the act. He hid but was discovered, arrested, and thrown in a Trujillo jail where he would remain for 112 days (From November 6, 1920 until February 26, 1921). On December 24, 1920 he won second place (first place was declared void) from the city hall of Trujillo for the poem, "Fabla de gesta (Tribute to Marqués de Torre Tagle)". Vallejo competed by hiding his identity with a pseudonym in an attempt to give impartiality to the competition.

In the work, "Vallejo en los infiernos", the author, a practicing lawyer, Eduardo González Viaña revealed key pieces of judicial documentation against the poet and showed deliberate fabrications by the judge and his enemies to imprison him. It indicted the victims but excluded prosecution to those criminally involved. They invented testimonies and attributed them to people who subsequently declared that they had never been to Santiago de Chuco, the place of the crime. Finally, the material author was escorted to Trujillo to testify before the Supreme Court. However, on the long journey, the gendarmes, French police officers, that guarded him, shot and killed him under the pretext that he had attempted to escape. Moreover, the author has investigated the other actions of the judge ad hoc. In truth, he was a lawyer for the large reed business "Casagrande" and of the "Quiruvilca" mine where the employees operated without a schedule and were victims of horrific working conditions. All of this highlights the political character of the criminal proceedings. With Vallejo it had tried to mock his generation, university students that attempted to rise up against the injustice and embraced anarchism and socialism, utopias of the century.

The judicial process was never closed. The poet left jail on behalf of a temporary release. Years later in Europe, he knew that he could never return to his home country. Jail and the "hells" revealed in this novel awaited him with an open door.

In 2007 the Judiciary of Peru vindicated Vallejo's memory in a ceremony calling to the poet unfairly accused. Nonetheless, 1922 he published his second volume of poetry, Trilce, which is still considered one of the most radically avant-garde poetry collections in the Spanish language. After publishing the short story collections Escalas melografiadas and Fabla salvaje in 1923, Vallejo emigrated to Europe under the threat of further incarceration and remained there until his death in Paris in 1938.

His European years found him living in dire poverty in Paris, with the exception of three trips to the USSR and a couple of years in the early 1930s spent in exile in Spain. In those years he shared the poverty with Pablo Picasso. In 1926 he met his first French lover, Henriette Maisse, with whom he lived until their breakup in October 1928. In 1927 he had formally met Georgette Marie Philippart Travers (see Georgette Vallejo), whom he had seen when she was 17 and lived in his neighborhood. This was also the year of his first trip to Russia. They eventually became lovers, much to the dismay of her mother. Georgette traveled with him to Spain at the end of December 1930 and returned in January 1932. In 1930 the Spanish government awarded him a modest author's grant. When he returned to Paris, he also went on to Russia to participate in the International Congress of Writers' Solidarity towards the Soviet Regime (not to be confused with the First Congress of Soviet Writers of 1934, which solidified the parameters for Socialist Realism). Back in Paris, Vallejo married Georgette Philippart in 1934. His wife remained a controversial figure concerning the publication of Vallejo's works for many years after his death.

A regular cultural contributor to weeklies in Lima, Vallejo also sent sporadic articles to newspapers and magazines in other parts of Latin America, Spain, Italy, and France. His USSR trips also led to two books of reportage he was able to get published early in the 1930s. Vallejo also prepared several theatrical works never performed during his lifetime, among them his drama Colacho Hermanos o Los Presidentes de America which shares content with another work he completed during this period, the socialist-realist novel El Tungsteno. He even wrote a children's book, Paco Yunque. After becoming emotionally and intellectually involved in the Spanish Civil War, Vallejo had a final burst of poetic activity in the late 1930s, producing two books of poetry (both published posthumously) whose titles and proper organization remain a matter of debate: they were published as Poemas humanos and España, aparta de mí este cáliz.

Death in Paris
At the beginning of 1938, he worked as a language and literature professor in Paris, but in March, he suffered from physical exhaustion. On March 24 he was hospitalized for an unknown disease (it was later understood that it was the reactivation of a kind of malaria, which he had suffered as a child), and on April 7 and 8, he became critically ill. He died a week later, on April 15, a holy, rainy Friday in Paris. It was not a Thursday, as he seemed to have predicted in his poem «"Black Stone on a White Stone"». His death was fictionalised in Roberto Bolano's novel Monsieur Pain. He was embalmed. His funeral eulogy was written by the French writer, Louis Aragon. On April 19, his remains were transferred to the Mansion of Culture, and later to the Montrouge cemetery.

On April 3, 1970, his widow, Georgette Vallejo, had his remains moved and reinterred in the Montparnasse cemetery.

Works

Los Heraldos Negros (1919)
Los Heraldos Negros (The Black Messengers) was completed in 1918, but not published until 1919. In the 1993 edited volume Neruda and Vallejo: Selected Poems, Robert Bly describes this collection as "a staggering book, sensual, prophetic, affectionate, wild," and as "the greatest single collection of poems I have ever read." The title is likely suggestive of the four horsemen of the apocalypse, as the book touches on topics of religiosity, life and death.

 Poem: "The black heralds"

There are blows in life, so powerful . . . I don't know!
Blows as from God's hatred; as if before them,
the backlash of everything suffered
were to dam up in the soul . . . I don't know!

They open dark furrows
in the fiercest face and in the strongest side.
Maybe they could be the horses of barbarous Attilas;
or the black heralds Death sends us.

They are the deep abysses of the soul's Christs,
of some revered faith Destiny blasphemes.
Those gory blows are the cracklings of a bread
that burns-up on us at the oven's door.

And man . . . Poor . . . poor! He turns his eyes,
as when a slap on the shoulder calls us;
he turns his crazed eyes, and everything lived
is dammed up, like a pond of guilt, in his gaze.
There are blows in life, so powerful . . . I don't know!

Trilce (1922)
Trilce, published in 1922, anticipated much of the avant-garde movement that would develop in the 1920s and 1930s. Vallejo's book takes language to a radical extreme, inventing words, stretching syntax, using automatic writing and other techniques now known as "surrealist" (though he did this before the Surrealist movement began). The book put Latin America at the center of the Avant-garde. Like James Joyce's Finnegans Wake, Trilce borders on inaccessibility.

España, Aparta de Mí Este Cáliz (1939)
In España, aparta de mí este cáliz (Spain, Take This Chalice from Me), Vallejo takes the Spanish Civil War (1936–39) as a living representation of a struggle between good and evil forces, where he advocates for the triumph of mankind. This is symbolised in the salvation of the Second Spanish Republic (1931–39) that was being attacked by fascist allied forces led by General Franco. In 1994 Harold Bloom included España, Aparta de Mí Este Cáliz in his list of influential works of the Western Canon.

Poemas Humanos (1939)
Poemas Humanos (Human Poems), published by the poet's wife after his death, is a leftist work of political, socially oriented poetry. Although a few of these poems appeared in magazines during Vallejo's lifetime, almost all of them were published posthumously. The poet never specified a title for this grouping, but while reading his body of work, his widow found that he had planned a book of "human poems", which is why his editors decided on this title. Of this last written work, it was said"... after a long silence, as if the presentiment of death might have urged him, he wrote in a few months the Poemas humanos."

Plays
Vallejo wrote five plays, none of which was staged or published during his lifetime.

Mampar is the subject of a critical letter from French actor and theatre director Louis Jouvet which says, in summary, "Interesting, but terminally flawed". It deals with the conflict between a man and his mother-in-law. The text itself is lost, assumed to have been destroyed by Vallejo.

Lock-Out (1930, written in French; a Spanish translation by Vallejo himself is lost) deals with a labour struggle in a foundry.

Entre las dos orillas corre el río (1930s) was the product of a long and difficult birth. Titles of earlier versions include Varona Polianova, Moscú contra Moscú, El juego del amor, del odio y de la muerte and several variations on this latter title.

Colacho hermanos o Presidentes de América (1934). Satire displaying Peruvian democracy as a bourgeois farce under pressure from international companies and diplomacy.

La piedra cansada (1937), a poetic drama set in the Inca period and influenced by Greek tragedy.

Essay
Vallejo published a chronicles book entitled Russia in 1931. Reflections at the foot of the Kremlin (Madrid, 1931) and prepared another similar book for the presses titled Russia before the second five-year plan (finished in 1932 but was later published in 1965).

Also, he organized two prose books about essay and reflection: Against Professional Secrecy (written, according to Georgette, between 1923 and 1929), and Art and Revolution (written between 1929 and 1931), which bring together diverse articles, some which were published in magazines and newspapers during the lifetime of the author. No Spanish editorial wanted to publish these books because of their Marxist and revolutionary character. They would later be published in 1973.

Novels
El tungsteno (1931). A social realist novel depicting the oppression of native Peruvian miners and their communities by a foreign-owned tungsten mine.

Towards the kingdom of the Sciris (1928) is a historic short story dealing with the Incan theme.

Fabla Salvaje (1924) Literally 'Wild Language', is a short novel which follows the insanity of a character who lives in the Andes.

The children's book, "Paco Yunque", was rejected in Spain in 1930 for being too violent for children. But after it was published in Peru in the 1960s, it became mandatory reading in the elementary schools in Peru.

Non-fiction
Rusia en 1931, reflexiones al pie del Kremlin (Russia in 1931, reflections at the foot of the Kremlin), first published in 1931, is a journalistic work describing Vallejo's impressions of the new socialist society that he saw being built in Soviet Russia.

Rusia ante el II Plan Quinquenal is a second work of Vallejo's chronicles of his travels in Soviet Russia, focusing on Joseph Stalin's second Five Year Plan. The book, originally written in 1931, was not published until 1965.

Vallejo in popular culture

 Guyanese poet Martin Carter dedicated two poems to Vallejo published in Poems of Affinity, (1980).
 Sam Shepard, an American playwright who won the Pulitzer Prize, wrote in Cruising Paradise (1997) that Cesar Vallejo is his favorite poet. Shepard's previous work, Motel Chronicles, begins with an inscription from a Vallejo poem, "The Nine Monsters": "...never did far away charge so close." Shepard collaborator Wim Wenders' sequel to his film Wings of Desire (1987), Faraway, So Close! (1993) takes its title from the same poem.
 American author Charles Bukowski wrote a poem about Vallejo that was included in his posthumously published book, What matters most is how well you walk through the fire.
 American poet Joe Bolton adapted several sections of Trilce in his book Days of Summer Gone (Galileo Press, 1990).
 The Swedish film Songs from the Second Floor (2000), directed by Roy Andersson, quotes Cesar Vallejo's work as a recurring motif.
 Greek singer and songwriter Thanasis Papakonstantinou wrote a song about Vallejo, sung by Sokratis Malamas.

Selected works available in English
The Complete Poetry of César Vallejo (Edited and Translated by Clayton Eshleman. With a Foreword by Mario Vargas Llosa, an Introduction by Efrain Kristal, and a Chronology by Stephen M. Hart.) University of California Press.  (shortlisted for the 2008 International Griffin Poetry Prize)
The Complete Posthumous Poetry of César Vallejo (Translators: Clayton Eshleman and José Rubia Barcia), University of California Press 
Malanga Chasing Vallejo: Selected Poems of César Vallejo with New Translations and Notes (Edited, Translated and with an Introduction by Gerard Malanga; also includes original and translated correspondence between the translator and Vallejo's widow Georgette de Vallejo) Three Rooms Press.  (Trade Paperback) and 978-1-9411101-0-2 (ebook).
Trilce (Translators: Michael Smith, Valentino Gianuzzi). Shearsman Books. 
The Complete Later Poems 1923–1938 (Translators: Michael Smith, Valentino Gianuzzi). Shearsman Books. 
The Black Heralds (Translator: Rebecca Seiferle) Copper Canyon Press 
Trilce (Translator: Rebecca Seiferle) Sheep Meadow Press. 
The Black Heralds (Translator: Barry Fogden) Allardyce, Barnett Publishers. 
The Black Heralds (Translators: Richard Schaaf and Kathleen Ross) Latin American Literary Review Press. 
Trilce (Translator: Dave Smith) Mishima Books. 
Autopsy on Surrealism (Translator: Richard Schaaf) Curbstone Press. 
Cesar Vallejo (Translators: Gordon Brotherstone and Edward Dorn) Penguin. 
Neruda and Vallejo: Selected Poems (Translators: Robert Bly and James Wright) Beacon Press. 
I'm going to speak of hope (Translator: Peter Boyle) Peruvian Consulate Publication.
Cesar Vallejo: An Anthology of His Poetry (Introduction by James Higgins) The Commonwealth and International Library. 
Selected Poems of Cesar Vallejo (Translator: H. R. Hays) Sachem Press. 
Poemas Humanos, Human Poems, by César Vallejo, a bilingual edition translated by Clayton Eshleman. Copyright 1968. Grove Press, 1969, xxv + 326 pp. .
The Mayakovsky Case (Translator: Richard Schaaf) Curbstone Press. 
Tungsten (Translator: Robert Mezey) Syracuse University Press. 
Songs of Home (Translators: Kathleen Ross and Richard Schaaf) Ziesing Brothers Book Emporium. 
Spain Take This Cup from Me (Translator: Mary Sarko ) Azul. 
Spain, Let This Cup Pass from Me (Translator: Álvaro Cardona-Hine) Azul. 
Trilce (Selections from the 1922 Edition), Vols. 38/39 and 40/41 (Translator: Prospero Saiz) Abraxas Press. 
Trilce (Homophonic translator: James Wagner). Calamari Press.

See also
 Peruvian literature
 List of Peruvian writers
 Latin American Literature

References

Further reading
English
Poetry and Politics: The Spanish Civil War Poetry of César Vallejo, George Lambie, 1992, Bulletin of Hispanic Studies, LXIX
Vallejo's Interpretation of Spanish Culture and History in the Himno a los voluntarios de la República, George Lambie, 1999, Bulletin of Hispanic Studies, LXXVI
Intellectuals, Ideology and Revolution: The Political Ideas of César Vallejo, George Lambie, 2000, Hispanic Research Journal, Vol.1, No.2
Vallejo and the End of History, George Lambie, 2002, Romance Quarterly, Vol.49, No.2
Vallejo and Democracy, George Lambie, 2004, Bulletin of Hispanic Studies (Higginschrift)
Poetry in Pieces: César Vallejo and Lyric Modernity, Michelle Clayton, 2011
César Vallejo: A Critical Bibliography of Research, Stephen M Hart, 2002
César Vallejo: The Dialectics of Poetry and Silence, Jean Franco, 1976
The Catastrophe of Modernity: Tragedy and the Nation in Latin American Literature, Patrick Dove, 2004
The Poem on the Edge of the Word: the Limits of Language and the Uses of Silence, D.C. Niebylski, 1993
Vallejo, Xavier Abril, 1958
The Poetry and Poetics of Cesar Vallejo: the Fourth Angle of the Circle, Adam Sharman, 1997
Wounded Fiction: Modern Poetry and Deconstruction, Joseph Adamson, 1988
Homage to Vallejo, Christopher Buckley, 2006
Trilce I: a Second Look, George Gordon Wing, 1972
Neruda and Vallejo in Contemporary United States Poetry, Mark Jonathan Cramer, 1976
“Vallejo on Language and Politics,” Letras hispanas: Revista de literatura y cultura, Rolando Pérez, 2008.
 https://web.archive.org/web/20110929150115/http://letrashispanas.unlv.edu/vol5iss2/perez.htm; https://web.archive.org/web/20090319121638/http://letrashispanas.unlv.edu/vol5iss2/perez.pdf
 “César Vallejo’s Ars Poética of Nonsense: A Deleuzean Reading of Trilce.” Dissidences: Hispanic Journal of Theory and Criticism, Rolando Pérez, 2008. www.dissidences/4PerezVallejo.html

Spanish
El Pensamiento Politico de César Vallejo y la Guerra Civil Española / George Lambie., 1993. Lima: Editorial Milla Batres
César Vallejo, el poeta y el hombre / Ricardo Silva-Santisteban. Lima, 2010
Recordando a Vallejo: La Bohemia de Trujillo / Luis Alva Castro, Luis. www.Tribuna-us.com
Ensayos vallejianos / William Rowe., 2006
César Vallejo al pie del orbe / Iván Rodríguez Chávez., 2006
Alcance filosófico en Cesar Vallejo y Antonio Machado / Antonio Belaunde Moreyra., 2005
César Vallejo : estudios de poética / Jesús Humberto Florencia., 2005
Poéticas y utopías en la poesía de César Vallejo / Pedro José Granados., 2004
César Vallejo : muerte y resurrección / Max Silva Tuesta., 2003
César Vallejo, arquitecto de la palabra, caminante de la gloria / Idelfonso Niño Albán., 2003
Algunos críticos de Vallejo y otros ensayos vallejianos / César Augusto Angeles Caballero., 2002
César Vallejo en la crítica internacional / Wilfredo Kapsoli Escudero., 2001
César Vallejo y el surrealismo / Juan Larrea., 2001
César Vallejo y la muerte de Dios / Rafael Gutiérrez Girardot., 2000
César Vallejo / Víctor de Lama., 2000
Recopilación de textos sobre César Vallejo / Raúl Hernández Novás., 2000
Mi encuentro con Vallejo; Prólogo de Luis Alva Castro / Antenor Orrego. Bogotá: Tercer Mundo Editores, 1989. 
Antenor Orrego y sus dos prólogos a Trilce / Manuel Ibáñez Rosazza. Trilce Editores: Trujillo, 1995
César Vallejo, Sus mejores obras. Ediciones Perú: Lima, 1962
César Vallejo, vida y obra / Luis Monguió. Editora Perú Nuevo: Lima, 1952
César Vallejo (1892–1938); Vida y obra, Revista Hispánica Moderna, New York, 1950.

External links

 

An excerpt of Vallejo´s work
Human Potential: The Life and Work of César Vallejo
Information about Vallejo from the Academy of American Poets
Griffin Poetry Prize biography, including audio and video clips of Guillermo Verdecchia reading Clayton Eshleman's translation of Vallejo's Guitar
Interview with Vallejo, the only extant interview with Vallejo, 1931.

1892 births
1938 deaths
People from Santiago de Chuco Province
National University of San Marcos alumni
20th-century Peruvian poets
Peruvian journalists
Peruvian educators
Peruvian essayists
Peruvian translators
Peruvian dramatists and playwrights
Peruvian speculative fiction writers
Mestizo writers
French–Spanish translators
People of the Spanish Civil War
Peruvian exiles
Prisoners and detainees of Peru
Communist writers
Communist poets
Burials at Montparnasse Cemetery
North Group (Trujillo)
Peruvian male poets